Marlon Vargas (born January 12, 2001) is an American soccer player who plays as a midfielder for Colorado Rapids 2 in MLS Next Pro.

Honors
Individual
MLS Next Pro Best XI: 2022

References

External links
 
 

Association football midfielders
American soccer players
Tacoma Defiance players
Colorado Rapids 2 players
USL Championship players
Sportspeople from Bakersfield, California
Soccer players from Washington (state)
2001 births
Living people
Soccer players from California
American sportspeople of Salvadoran descent
MLS Next Pro players